Katora Lake is an alpine glacial lake located in the upper reaches of Jahaz Banda, Kumrat valley in Upper Dir District of Khyber Pakhtunkhwa the Province of Pakistan. The lake is fed by the surrounding melting glacier waters. The word Katora means "bowl" in Pashto. It was named after the lakes resemblance to a bowl shape.

See also

Mahodand Lake - Kalam Valley
Kundol Lake - Kalam Valley
Daral Lake - Swat Valley
Lake Saiful Muluk - Kaghan Valley

References

Lakes of Khyber Pakhtunkhwa
Tourist attractions in Swat
Upper Dir District
Tourism in Khyber Pakhtunkhwa